Đurđe Ninković (born 1942) is a lawyer, legal commentator and political activist who was a founding member of the Democratic Party (DS) in Serbia who joined the Founding Committee of the Democratic Party in December 1989. From late December the meetings of the Founding Committee and later the Executive Committee of the DS took place in his law offices in Belgrade where the Pismo o namerama (Letter of intent), the first party political program of the DS, was drafted and published in January 1990. At this time the central office of the DS was also located in Mr. Ninković's law offices in hotel Astoria for a few months.

Biography 

Djurdje was brought up in a pro-democracy family where both his parents were opponents of communist totalitarianism. His father, Milorad Dj. Ninković, was a cavalry officer in the Royal Yugoslav Army and a prominent lawyer educated in France and Kingdom of Yugoslavia, who was imprisoned and persecuted after the communist government was established in Yugoslavia in 1944 and his mother, Višnja (née Popović), also studied law at the University of Belgrade. They both believed in individual human rights and the rule of law which were trampled by the communist revolution.  This influenced Djurdje in his belief that for Serbia to move forward it was first necessary to fully dismantle the legacy of the communist dictatorship.

He graduated from Belgrade Law School in 1964 and completed post-graduate studies at the University of London in 1968. He is a Salzburg Global Fellow, being an alumnus of the Salzburg Global Seminar course in American Law and Legal Institutions of 1977 and is also an alumnus of the Kokkalis Program at Harvard Kennedy School, Executive Education leadership course (2000), having been awarded a Kokkalis Foundation scholarship.

He is the author of more than seventy legal articles on various topics, particularly focused on ownership of private property, restitution, rehabilitation of political prisoners, the rule of law and independence of the judiciary in various legal journals.

Political life 
Djurdje was a member of the Founding Committee of the Democratic Party from late December 1989. He was elected Secretary of the Executive Committee  at the founding party conference in February 1990 and was an elected member of the General and Executive Committees of the Democratic Party until July 1992. In 1990 he was also a founding Director of the Democratic Party opposition newspaper Demokratija.

He left the DS with the pro-DEPOS coalition wing of the party and was a founding member of the Democratic Party of Serbia (DSS) in July 1992 with Vojislav Koštunica, Vladeta Janković, Mirko Petrović, Draško Petrović, Vladan Batić and others. Initially, for the first few months, the administrative central office of the DSS was also located in his law offices in hotel Astoria. He was elected to the DSS' General Committee at the founding party conference.

Both within the DS and DSS he was concerned with establishing a democratic system in Serbia premised on the rule of law with a strong independent judiciary and a government of just laws. He campaigned for the adoption of four specific essential laws to achieve a moral, political and economic break with the totalitarian past which would also underpin the establishment of society based on democratic values and respect for individual human rights.  The four laws are: the Law of restitution of property forcibly nationalised by the communist regime without compensation; the Law of privatisation; the Law of rehabilitation of political prisoners; and the Law of lustration, effectively barring those individuals who had been instrumental in the abuse of human rights under communism from holding public office for a period of years.

His published view was that society, by adopting these laws, would also make a moral statement that totalitarian policies had failed and had been deeply unjust and would make a best attempt to right the wrongs perpetrated over more than 50 years of communist rule and establish a free market economy allowing individuals rather than the state to control economic resources.

In 2001, he was appointed Deputy Minister of Justice  in the Cabinet of Serbia led by Zoran Đinđić, the Prime Minister. He chaired various government expert working groups drafting democratic laws to underpin the post-communist civil society, including laws regulating non-governmental organisations (NGOs), political parties and the judiciary.

After leaving office he remained involved as a legal expert within government working groups preparing draft legislation as the deputy chairman of the working group preparing the draft law on Restitution of confiscated church property (adopted by Parliament in 2006).

He was also the chairman of the working group preparing the draft law on restitution of nationalised and confiscated property in 2001 (which was based on the premise of restitutio in rem (return of the original property ), and was a member of working groups preparing the law on Rehabilitation of political prisoners (adopted by Parliament in 2005) and the law on registration and evidencing of nationalised/confiscated property (adopted by Parliament in 2005). He also campaigned for the adoption of legislation on lustration of communist apparatchiks especially within the government, judiciary and the police (such laws having been adopted in post-communist countries including Poland, Czech Republic and Hungary).

Since 2006 he is no longer involved in party politics having experienced a continuing lack of political will for genuine deep rooted political reforms.

In 2009 he actively campaigned for the immediate adoption of a just Law of restitution of nationalised and confiscated property, which is a condition of Serbia's potential membership of the EU. His campaign included a direct action occupation of hotel Astoria which had been built by his grandfather, Djurdje S. Ninković, and owned by his family until forceful nationalisation by the Communist regime in 1948.

Awards and honours
2017: Appointed Member of the Privy Council by HRH Crown Prince  Alexander Karađorđević of Serbia     .
2017: Knight Grand Cross of the Royal Order of the White Eagle   
1988: Knight of the Order of the Polar Star    by HM King Carl XVI Gustaf of Sweden, for legal services as long standing Counsel to the Swedish Embassy in Belgrade.

Criticism of flawed attempts at restitution 
He has been very critical of The Law of Restitution of Property and Compensation, which was enacted by the Government of Serbia in October 2011 and implemented from March 2012. The law imposes severe restrictions on the type of property which can be returned. This will result in a very small proportion of nationalised property being returned to their rightful owners. It also imposes an absolute cap of EUR 2 billion for the total amount of compensation which can be paid to those owners whose property will not be returned. This represents a small fraction of the total value of property which has been nationalised estimated at between EUR 220 billion and EUR 50 billion. Compensation will, on the whole, be payable over a period of 15 years by issuing Government Bonds to the owners. By contrast, estimates suggest that over the same 15-year period corruption in the public procurement sector will cost Serbia more than 15 billion Euros   and also estimates by the Serbian Chamber of Commerce suggest that the value of property currently owned by the State of Serbia (including nationalised property) exceeds EUR 185 billion.

References

External links
  Article by Dj. Ninkovic about the assassination of the late Zoran Djindjić in English
 Transcript of interview on B92 TV about the law on rehabilitation of political prisoners in Serbian
 Article on reform of Serbian Judiciary in Serbian
 Article on Restitution of nationalised and confiscated property on behalf of Democratic Party of Serbia (DSS) in Serbian
 Short biography in English
Council of Europe Resolution 1096 (1996)

1942 births
Living people
Alumni of the University of London
Democratic Party (Serbia) politicians
Democratic Party of Serbia politicians
20th-century Serbian lawyers
Serbian activists
University of Belgrade Faculty of Law alumni
Knights of the Order of the Polar Star
Government ministers of Serbia
21st-century Serbian lawyers
Yugoslav lawyers